is a Japanese professional golfer, who plays on the European Tour, Japan Golf Tour and the Asian Tour.

Kawamura won his first title in 2013 at the Asia-Pacific Panasonic Open on the Japan Golf Tour, a tournament also co-sanctioned by the Asian Tour.

In November 2020, Kawamura recorded his best finish to his European Tour career when he finished runner-up at the Aphrodite Hills Cyprus Showdown; one shot behind Robert MacIntyre.

Professional wins (1)

Japan Golf Tour wins (1)

1Co-sanctioned by the Asian Tour

Japan Golf Tour playoff record (0–1)

Asian Tour wins (1)

1Co-sanctioned by the Japan Golf Tour

Results in major championships

CUT = missed the half-way cut
"T" = tied

Results in World Golf Championships
Results not in chronological order before 2015.

"T" = Tied

Team appearances
Amateur
Eisenhower Trophy (representing Japan): 2010

Professional
Amata Friendship Cup (representing Japan): 2018

See also
2018 European Tour Qualifying School graduates

References

External links

Japanese male golfers
Japan Golf Tour golfers
Asian Tour golfers
Golfers at the 2010 Asian Games
Asian Games competitors for Japan
Sportspeople from Mie Prefecture
1993 births
Living people